Trebanog Football Club is a Welsh football team based in Porth, Wales. They play in the South Wales Alliance League First Division, which is in the fifth tier of the Welsh football league system.

History
The club was established in 2013 By Dean Gill, Dean Lewis and Dylan Lewis, out of the reserves of AFC Porth, initially playing in the Rhondda & District League. Winning the League twice Lucania Cup twice and the South Wales Intermediate Cup They went and gained promotion to the South Wales Alliance League in the 2016–17 season, finishing as runners-up and gaining promotion to Division One.  In the subsequent 2017–18 season they finished third in Division One, gaining promotion to the Premier Division.

Honours

South Wales Alliance League Division Two: – Runners-up: 2016–17
Rhondda & District League Premier Division: – Champions: 2015–16
Lucania Cup Champions 2015 - 2016
South Wales Intermediate Cup Champions 2015 - 2016
Lucania Cup Champions 2014 - 2015
Rhondda & District League runners up 
2013 - 2014 -
2014 - 2015

References

External links
Club official twitter
Club official facebook

Football clubs in Wales
South Wales Alliance League clubs
2013 establishments in Wales
Rhondda & District League
Association football clubs established in 2013
Rhondda & District League clubs